El gran premio ("The Grand Prize") is a 1958 Mexican film. It stars Sara García.

Plot
Cholita lives in an old people's home that is about to be closed for its lack of funds. To avoid it Cholita decides to participate in a famous TV show in which she could win a lot of money.

Cast
 Sara García - Soledad Fuentes Lagos 'Cholita'
 Irma Dorantes - Hermana Piedad
 Ángel Infante - Fernando González
 Julio Villarreal - Don Rubén Dario López de Urquijo
 Mercedes Soler - Madre superiora
 María Gentil Arcos - Anciana en asilo 
 Lupe Carriles - Francisca
 Julián García

External links

References

1958 films
Mexican drama films
1950s Spanish-language films
1950s Mexican films